Kenichi Kuboya (born 11 March 1972) is a Japanese professional golfer.

Kuboya won four events on the Japan Golf Tour between 1997 and 2002, picking up two wins in each of those seasons.

Both of Kuboya's wins on the Japan Golf Tour in 2002 came in playoffs against seasoned campaigners. He beat Shingo Katayama in extra holes at the Japan PGA Championship and another win against former Open champion Todd Hamilton at the Munsingwear Open KSB Cup. This remains the biggest win of his career.

Kuboya had a brief stint on the PGA Tour where he played a full season in 2003. His best finish of the year was a T13 at the 84 Lumber Classic of Pennsylvania and he was not able to keep his card. He would go back to play on the Japan Golf Tour in 2004, where he currently plays.

Kuboya played in his first major championship in 2002 at The Open Championship, where he made the cut, but did not contend on the weekend. His next major was the 2009 Open Championship at Turnberry in Scotland. He finished his first round birdie, birdie, eagle, birdie to finish in a tie for second. He would finish the tournament tied for 27th.

Kuboya won his fifth Japan Golf Tour title at the 2011 Canon Open, nine years after his last win and subsequently won the 2012 Japan Open and the 2017 Panasonic Open.

Professional wins (7)

Japan Golf Tour wins (7)

1Co-sanctioned by the Asian Tour
 The Japan Open Golf Championship is also a Japan major championship.

Japan Golf Tour playoff record (3–1)

Results in major championships

CUT = missed the half-way cut
"T" = tied

Results in World Golf Championships

"T" = Tied

See also
2002 PGA Tour Qualifying School graduates

References

External links

Japanese male golfers
Japan Golf Tour golfers
PGA Tour golfers
Sportspeople from Kanagawa Prefecture
1972 births
Living people